Tullaherin is a civil parish and townland in County Kilkenny, Ireland.

History
Tullaherin townland is the site of a number of historical archeological remains, including a round tower, an 11th-13th century ruined church and two ogham stones. Kilbline Castle, a 16th-century tower house, also lies within the civil parish.

The Tullaherin round tower stands 22.5 m high and was probably built in the 11th century. The cap is missing and the top 3 m are a second phase of masonry. It is reported that the tower was struck by lightning in 1121. Most probably it was after this date that the top was rebuilt on the same principle as Clonmacnoise with eight windows instead of the usual four.

The present church at Tullaherin was built about 1840. The Tullaherin Folk Museum can be viewed at the old parochial residence. The museum was established in 1981 by Duchas and the Tullaherin Heritage Society.

Further reading 
 Edward J. Law: Round tower, in: Old Kilkenny Review 2002, pp. 16–17. 
 May Sparks: Tullaherin, in: Old Kilkenny Review 1953, pp. 47–49.

Notes

References

External links
 Tullaherin Heritage Society 

Civil parishes of County Kilkenny